Athboy Aerodrome  is a small airfield located  northeast of Athboy, a town in County Meath (Contae na Mí), Ireland.  This aerodrome is licensed by the Aeronautical Services Department of the Irish Aviation Authority. It is also known as Ballyboy Airfield.

Ballyboy Airfield is situated 2 nm northeast of Athboy Co. Meath, Ireland, only 40 minutes from Dublin by motorway.  

The first plane to land in Ballyboy was in 1994, on a grass runway cut between two fields on the Ballyboy Farm of near east/west orientation. Mick O'Connor’s landing in EI-CGV, a Piper Cub J5A, set in stone the future of aviation at Ballyboy, an airfield which has grown to be one of the larger and best recognised airfields in the country.

Ballyboy is located outside controlled airspace and has a 600 metre grass runway, hangarage and state of the art Avgas and Jet A-1 fuel systems, with mogas by arrangement from Athboy town (2 km).

It hosts an annual charity Fly-in and Family Fun Day on the June bank holiday is the most-visited fly-in event in the country, with visiting pilots both from home and abroad each year. They had over 70 aircraft and 1,000 visitors by road in 2018 and raised EUR16,000 for Down Syndrome Ireland, bringing the total raised to over EUR50,000 in the last four years.

It regularly hosts groups of pilots touring the country from overseas, including a fleet of 15 motor gliders in 2016 and a group of 5 UK Austers. They welcome fly-ins and touring groups from home and abroad, with have facilities for camping, including showers and WiFi. Bed and breakfast and hotel accommodation can be arranged locally -  You can be assured of a great welcome and a trip to remember!

Ideally located for aviators from all over Ireland and as the first port of call for many aircraft crossing the Irish Sea. Ballyboy is set in the heart of County Meath and within easy reach of many of Ireland's ancient sites and monuments, including the Hill of Tara, Newgrange stone age passage tomb and the UNESCO World Heritage Site at Brú na Bóinne. For the 2019 brochure for Ireland's Ancient East  and Boyne Valley Tourism please click here or visit http://www.meath.ie/tourism

Facilities 
Fuels available on site are JET A1 and 100LL, while mogas (petrol) is available 2 miles away in the town of Athboy.

Ballyboy has ample aircraft parking with hangarage. Limited maintenance facilities are also available.

Airfield information 
Ballyboy Athboy Airfield (ICAO EIMH) is situated 2 nm northeast of Athboy Co. Meath, Ireland and only 40 minutes from Dublin by motorway, putting it in an ideal location to accommodate visitors from all over Ireland and overseas.

GPS coordinates: N53°38'27 W006°52'72.

 600m grass runway 29/11
 Avgas and Jet A-1 fuel
 Mogas available in Athboy town (2 Km)
 Ample parking
 Hangarage
 Tea/coffee, coffee dock and lounge area available
 Shower facilities
 Camping - contact to arrange
 Restaurants, supermarket and services are available in nearby Athboy town, just 2 Km from Ballyboy Airfield.
 Accommodation, taxi and car rental, can be made available. Call to arrange this.
 Licensed by the Aeronautical Services Department of the Irish Aviation Authority

References

Airports in the Republic of Ireland
Transport in County Meath